The 2022 season was AIK 131st in existence, their 94th season in Allsvenskan and their 17th consecutive season in the league.

Season events
On 3 September 2021, AIK announced the signing of Henry Atola from Tusker, with the player officially joining on 1 January 2022 on a contract until 1 September 2026.

On 21 December 2021, AIK announced the signings of Jesper Ceesay from Brommapojkarna and Josafat Mendes from Hammarby, with both players officially joining on 1 January 2022 on contracts until 31 December 2025.

On 9 March, AIK announced the signing of Axel Björnström on a contract until 31 December 2024, after the player had ended his contract with Arsenal Tula.

On 31 March, Benjamin Kimpioka joined AIK 2.5-year contract after leaving Sunderland for an undisclosed fee.

On 1 April, AIK announced the signing of Collins Sichenje from Leopards on a contract until 31 December 2026.

On 4 April, AIK announced the singing of Jordan Larsson on a short-term contract until 30 June, after the player invoked a special regulation introduced by FIFA that allowed him to suspend his Spartak Moscow contract in relation to the Russian invasion of Ukraine and join another team until the end of the season. 

On 5 May, AIK announced that they had signed a pre-contract agreement with John Guidetti for the player to join the club on contact until 31 December 2025, from 1 July once his Alavés contract has expired.

On 18 July, Tom Strannegård extended his contract with AIK until 31 December 2024, and then joined Start for the remainder of the season.

On 5 August, AIK announced the year-long loan signing of Vincent Thill from Vorskla Poltava.

Squad

Out on loan

Transfers

In

Loans in

Out

Loans out

Released

Friendlies

Competitions

Overview

Allsvenskan

League table

Results summary

Results by matchday

Results

2021–22 Svenska Cupen

Group stage

Knockout stage

2022–23 Svenska Cupen

Progressed to the 2023 season

UEFA Europa Conference League

Qualifying rounds

Squad statistics

Appearances and goals

|-
|colspan="14"|Players away on loan:

|-
|colspan="14"|Players who appeared for AIK but left during the season:

|}

Goal scorers

Clean sheets

Disciplinary record

References

AIK Fotboll seasons
AIK Fotboll